The Great Lakes Athletic Conference is a four-member IHSAA-sanctioned conference located entirely within Lake County. The conference is among the youngest in the state, created in 2007 following the disbandment of the Lake Athletic Conference and after failing to find acceptance in another conference for each of the four schools. The GLAC's "sister" conferences also created from the Lake Athletic Conference are the Greater South Shore Athletic Conference and the Northwest Crossroads Conference. At the start of the 2021–2022 school year, the conference lost two members as Hammond Clark and Hammond Gavit were closed due to the consolidation of Hammond Schools.

Membership

State Champions

Hammond High School Wildcats (17)
 1905 Boys Track & Field
 1906 Boys Track & Field
 1935 Wrestling
 1936 Wrestling
 1936 Boys Swimming & Diving
 1937 Wrestling
 1938 Boys Track & Field
 1939 Boys Track & Field
 1940 Boys Swimming & Diving
 1941 Boys Swimming & Diving
 1942 Boys Swimming & Diving
 1943 Boys Swimming & Diving
 1951 Boys Swimming & Diving
 1952 Boys Swimming & Diving
 1954 Boys Swimming & Diving
 1962 Wrestling
 1963 Wrestling

Hammond Clark Pioneers (1)
 1938 Wrestling

Hammond Morton Governors (1)
 1965 Football

Resources 
 IHSAA Conferences
 IHSAA Directory
 Northern Indiana Football History
 IHSAA State Champions
 IHSAA Classification
 IHSAA Football Classification

Indiana high school athletic conferences
High school sports conferences and leagues in the United States